Nana Palshikar (1907 – 1 June 1984) was an Indian actor who appeared in over 80 Hindi films. He made his film debut in 1935 with Dhuwandhar, and went on to play character roles in both Hindi mainstream and arthouse films. He was also cast in small parts in a few international productions such as Maya (1966), The Guru (1969) and Gandhi (1982). Palshikar was awarded the Filmfare Award for Best Supporting Actor twice, in 1962 and 1965. He was recognised with an award in the same category by the Bengal Film Journalists' Association in 1965.

Career
Palshikar made his first film appearance in 1935 along with Leela Chitnis in Sukumar Chatterjee's Dhurandhar. He appeared in two more films in this decade, Kangan and Durga (1939), both of which were produced at the Bombay Talkies production house and were the two final films directed by German director Franz Osten.

After a long break of 14 years, during which he appeared only in one film Bahurani (1940), he returned to the screen in Bimal Roy's 1953 picture Do Bigha Zamin (Two Acres of Land), in which he played Dhangu Maheto, alongside actors such as Balraj Sahni and Nirupa Roy. The film was a major critical success and won several national and international honours. He followed it with supporting roles in other successful films of this decade, such as V. Shantaram's Jhanak Jhanak Payal Baaje, Bimal Roy's Devdas, Raj Kapoor's Shree 420, Sombhu Mitra's Jagte Raho and Hrishikesh Mukherjee's Anari.

In 1960, Palshikar appeared in Kanoon, a courtroom drama involving a murder case. Directed by B. R. Chopra, the film saw Palshikar playing Kaalia, a petty thief who is caught and charged with murder for no fault of his own. Palshikar's performance earned him his first Filmfare Award for Best Supporting Actor. In a retrospective review in 2009, The Hindu noted: "the star of the second half is Nana Palshikar, who slips into the role of a petty thief with a commanding performance."

In 1963, Palshikar appeared in Khwaja Ahmad Abbas's Shehar Aur Sapna (The City and The Dreams). It is a social film which portrays the struggle of pavement dwellers in the backdrop of rapid industrialisation. The film, a love story that takes place in a drain pipe, received the President's Gold Medal Award and the National Film Award for Best Feature Film. Palshikar's performance as Johnny earned him his second Filmfare Award for Best Supporting Actor, and he was acknowledged as Best Supporting Actor (Hindi) by the Bengal Film Journalists' Association.

John Berry's Maya (1966) saw Palshikar playing Sajid Khan's father. In 1969, James Ivory cast him in the foreign co-production The Guru. Ivory said: "I didn't know a great deal about him when we cast him... He was said to be a very good actor, which I took on faith." Judith Crist from the New York Magazine described his small part of "The Guru's Guru" in the film as "an unforgettable cameo".

In the 1970s, Palshikar continued to portray father figures or authoritative characters such as judges. For instance, he played a father in many films such as B. R. Chopra's Dhund, based on Agatha Christie's play The Unexpected Guest in 1973 and Yaaron Ka Yaar in 1977. However, these roles were generally relatively minor and he was often uncredited for his performances, such as his role as a judge in Jwar Bhata in 1972.

He continued playing a father into the 1980s, appearing in Aakrosh (1980), playing Om Puri's dad. His last major film was in the epic film Gandhi in 1982, a Richard Attenborough directed biographical film based on the life of Mohandas Gandhi, who led the nonviolent resistance movement against British colonial rule in India during the first half of the 20th century. However, his role was very minor, playing a villager. His last appearance was in the film Kanoon Kya Karega, again playing a parent.

He died on 1 June 1984 in Bombay, aged 77.

Awards 
1962: Filmfare Best Supporting Actor Award - Kanoon
1965: Filmfare Best Supporting Actor Award - Shehar Aur Sapna
1965: BFJA Awards, Best Supporting Actor (Hindi) - Shehar Aur Sapna

Filmography

Dhuwandhar (1935)
Kangan (1939)
Durga (1939)
Bahurani (1940)
Jhoola (1941)
Kunwara Baap (1942)
Shakuntala (1943)
Do Bigha Zamin (1953) as Dhangu Maheto
Shamsheer (1953)
Daera (1953)
Baap Beti (1954)
Shree 420 (1955) as Gambler with goatee
Sabse Bada Rupaiya (1955)
Railway Platform (1955) as Station Master
Jhanak Jhanak Payal Baaje (1955) as Sadhu
Devdas (1955) as Street singer
Jagte Raho (1956) as Doctor
Shatranj (1956)
New Delhi (1956) as Subramaniam
Bandhan (1956)
Do Roti (1957) as Malti's Dad
Baarish (1957) as Gopal dada
Ab Dilli Dur Nahin (1957) as Mukundlal's lawyer
Teerth Yatra (1957)
Phir Subah Hogi (1958) as Sohni's Father (uncredited)
Karigar (1958) as Astrologer
Jailor (1958) as Ramsingh Choudhry
Gaj Gauri (1958)
Farishta (1958)
Char Dil Char Raahein (1959) as Pujariji
Jaalsaaz (1959)
Anari (1959)  as Evil Priest
Jis Desh Men Ganga Behti Hai (1960) as Tau
Mera Ghar Mere Bachche (1960) as Sharmaji
Kanoon (1960) as Kaalia
College Girl (1960) as Biharilal Sharma
Maya (1961) as Jyothsi (uncredited)
Babasa Ri Laadi (1961)
Aashiq (1962) as Thakur / Renuka's Father
Main Chup Rahungi (1962) as Narayan
Bijli Chamke Jamna Paar (1962)
Shehar Aur Sapna (1963) as Johhny, the violinist
Nartakee (1963) as Prof. Verma
Gumrah (1963) as Meena's Father
Bharosa (1963) as Shivcharan Das
Sangam (1964) as Nathu
Dosti (1964) as Sharma
Cha Cha Cha (1964) as Gyan Das
Shagoon (1964)
Pooja Ke Phool (1964) as Hansraj
Hamara Ghar (1964)
Geet Gaaya Pattharonne (1964) as Dinanath
Door Gagan Ki Chhaon Mein (1964)
Bhoot Bungla (1965)as Ramlal 'Ramu'
Arzoo (1965)
Aasmaan Mahal (1965)
Maya (1966) as Raji's Father
Biradari (1966) as Deepu
Anupama (1966) as Mohan Sharma's assistant (uncredited)
Aakhri Khat (1966)
Hamraaz (1967) as Jumma
Boond Jo Ban Gayee Moti (1967) as Head Master
Baharon Ke Sapne (1967) as Bholanath
Aurat (1967) as Parvati's Moneylender
Duniya (1968) as Girdhari
Balram Shri Krishna (1968)
Man Ka Meet (1969) as Doctor
The Guru (1969) as The Guru's Guru
Sambandh (1969) as Nityada
Prarthana (1969)
Jaal Saz (1969) as Mahavir
Doli (1969) as Ganpat Lala
Aadmi Aur Insaan (1969) as Justice B.N. Desai
Heer Raanjha (1970) as Diwan, the King's Inquisitor
Uphaar (1971) as Ramchandra Awasthi
Ganga Tera Pani Amrit (1971) as Masterji
Dushmun (1971) as Ganga Din
Rut Rangeeli Ayee (1972) as Kundanlal
Dastaan (1972) as Dr. Khanna
Lalkar (1972) as Colonel Kapoor
Joroo Ka Ghulam (1972) as Nandlal
Yaar Mera (1972) as Deena Nath
Shor (1972)
Jeet (1972) as Ratan's dad (uncredited)
Badle Ki Aag (1973)
Dhund (1973) as The Judge
Jwar Bhata (1973) as Judge #2 (uncredited)
Prem Parbat (1973)
Naya Nasha (1973) as Protesting student's dad
Prem Nagar (1974) as Puran
Ishq Ishq Ishq (1974)
Albeli (1974)
Dharmatma (1975) as Purshottam (Kundan's dad)
Sikka (1976)
Subah Zaroor Aayegi (1977)
Shyam Tere Kitne Naam (1977)
Nachdi Jawani (1977) punjabi movie 
Yaaron Ka Yaar (1977) as Malti's dad
Paapi (1977) as Seth. Ghanshyamdas
Karm (1977) as Shivlal (Premnath's father-in-law)
Daku Aur Mahatma (1977) 
Charandas (1977) as Judge
Ganga Ki Saugandh (1978) as Keshavram
Pati Patni Aur Woh (1978) as Nirmala's Nanaji
Saajan Bina Suhagan (1978) as Asha's dad
Jaandaar (1979)
Aakrosh (1980) as Bhiku's dad
The Burning Train (1980) as Seema's Mamaji
The Naxalites (1980) as Charu Majumdar
Swayamvar (1980) as Purohit Shankarprasad
Sampoorna Santoshi Maa Ki Mahima (1981) 
Agni Pareeksha (1981) as Dinanath Sharma
Gandhi (1982) as Villager
Unchi Uraan (1984)
Kanoon Kya Karega (1984) as Parent of accused youth (final film role)

References

External links
 

1907 births
1984 deaths
Indian male film actors
Male actors in Hindi cinema
Filmfare Awards winners
20th-century Indian male actors